Dachiardite-K is a rare zeolite-group mineral with the formula K4(Si20Al4O48)•13H2O. It is the potassium-analogue of dachiardite-Ca and dachiardite-Na, as suggested by the suffix "-K".

Occurrence and association
Dachiardite-K was discovered in opal-chalcedony veins in Eastern Rhodopes, Bulgaria. It is associated with barite, calcite, clinoptilolite-Ca, clinoptilolite-K, celadonite, dachiardite-Ca, dachiardite-Na, ferrierite-K, ferrierite-Mg, ferrierite-Na, mordenite, and smectite.

References

Zeolites
Tectosilicates
Silicate minerals
Potassium minerals
Aluminium minerals
Monoclinic minerals